The 1963 Championnat National 1 Final was the first final of the Algerian Championnat after the country's independence. The match took place on June 16, 1963, at Stade d'El Anasser in Algiers with kick-off at 15:00. USM Alger beat MC Alger 3-0 to win their first Algerian Championnat.

Critériums d'Honneur

Groupe I

Groupe V

Final rankings (Algiers)

Championnat Algiers Final

Semi-finals

Pre-match
A mini tournament is organized between these clubs to designate the county champion. USM Alger finally prevail in the final two goals to one against MC Alger and will enter the final round with winners from other regions. The runner accompany because it was decided that the central region for the first two teams qualify criterion.

A tournament is held between the winners of these regional criteriums, a sort of "play-off" whose goal is to identify the first "Champion of Algeria football." In the semi-final draw to give USM Alger match against USM Bône and MC Alger facing SCM Oran. In the first meeting, Bône little bow face to Algiers by the rule of the many corners obtained in a scoreless game after a goal everywhere. In the other match, the mouloudia wins against the Oran on the final score four goals to nil. At the end of the tournament, the first title was awarded to USM Alger, MC Alger winner by three goals to nil. The two losers of the semifinals fought for third place, and that's USM Bône who prevailed over the SCM Oran by four goals to one.

Details

References

Algerian Ligue Professionnelle 1 finals
1
Algeria
USM Alger matches